Derivative is a 2005 Turkish drama film, written, produced and directed by Ulaş İnaç based on a short story by Miguel de Cervantes, about the complicated relationships between three people who confess their thoughts each evening to the camera for a movie project.

Plot
Nazım (Güçlü Yalçıner) is a successful young Istanbul writer who is about to marry Süreyya (Gülçin Santırcıoğlu). Süreyya is not sure about Nazım's love and so she asks her best friend Burcu (Beste Bereket) to seduce him in order to test his fidelity. Reluctantly Burcu complies and then she falls in love.

References

External links 

2005 drama films
2005 films
Films set in Turkey
Films shot in Turkey
Golden Orange Award for Best Film winners
Turkish drama films
Films scored by Toygar Işıklı
2000s Turkish-language films